Edgar Henrichsen (19 January 1879 - 24 August 1955) was a Danish composer and organist.  He was the brother of Roger Henrichsen, and was a student of Gustav Helsted and Alexandre Guilmant.

Danish composers
Male composers
Danish classical organists
Male classical organists
1879 births
1955 deaths